The rusty pipistrelle (Pipistrellus rusticus) is a species of vesper bat. It is found in Angola, Botswana, Burkina Faso, Central African Republic, Chad, Ethiopia, Ghana, Kenya, Malawi, Mozambique, Namibia, Nigeria, Senegal, South Africa, Sudan, Tanzania, Uganda, Zambia, and Zimbabwe. Its natural habitats are dry and moist savanna.

References

Pipistrellus
Mammals described in 1861
Taxa named by Robert Fisher Tomes
Bats of Africa
Taxonomy articles created by Polbot